Olaf Ittenbach (born 27 February 1969) is a German horror movie director, actor and special effects artist.

Filmography

Black Past (1989)
The Burning Moon (1992)
Premutos: The Fallen Angel (1997)
Riverplay (2000)
Legion of the Dead (2001)
Evil Rising (2002) 
Beyond the Limits (2003)
Garden of Love (2003)
Chain Reaction (2006)
Familienradgeber (2006)
Dard Divorce (2007)
Familienradgeber 2 (2009) 
No Reason (2010)
Legend of Hell (2012)
Savage Love (2013)
5 Seasons (2014)

References

External links
 

1969 births
Living people
People from Fürstenfeldbruck (district)
Film directors from Bavaria
Horror film directors
Special effects people